Alain Giguère (born October 24, 1958) is a Canadian politician who was elected to the House of Commons of Canada in the 2011 election. He represented the electoral district of Marc-Aurèle-Fortin as a member of the New Democratic Party. In the 2015 election he ran in Thérèse-De Blainville, but lost to Liberal Ramez Ayoub.

Before to being elected, Giguère was a tax lawyer. He has a bachelor's degree in political science, a bachelor's degree in legal science, and a certificate in social justice.

Before finally being elected in 2011, Giguère had run unsuccessfully in seven previous federal elections, in Verdun—Saint-Paul in 1984, in Roberval in 1993, 1997 and 2000, in Laval in 2004 and 2008, and in Laval—Les Îles in 2006, as well as provincially once for the New Democratic Party of Quebec in Saint-Henri in 1985.

Electoral record

See also 
Politics of Canada
Elections in Canada

References

External links 

1958 births
Living people
Members of the House of Commons of Canada from Quebec
New Democratic Party MPs
People from Lachine, Quebec
Politicians from Montreal
Université du Québec à Montréal alumni
21st-century Canadian politicians